The Śūraṅgama Sūtra (Sanskrit, Sūtra of the Heroic March) (Taisho no. 945) is a Mahayana Buddhist sutra that has been especially influential on Korean Buddhism (where it remains a major subject of study in Sŏn monasteries) and Chinese Buddhism (where it was a regular part of daily liturgy during the Song). It was particularly important for Zen/Chan Buddhism. The doctrinal outlook of the Śūraṅgama Sūtra is that of Buddha-nature, Yogacara thought, and esoteric Buddhism.

The Śūraṅgama Sūtra was widely accepted as a sutra in East Asian Buddhism, where it has traditionally been included as part of Chinese-language Tripitakas. In the modern Taisho Tripitaka, it is placed in the Esoteric Sutra category (密教部). The sutra's Śūraṅgama Mantra is widely recited in China, Korea, Japan and Vietnam as part of temple liturgies. 

Most modern academic scholars (including Mochizuki Shinko, Paul Demieville, Kim Chin-yol, Lü Cheng 呂澂, Charles Muller and Kogen Mizuno), argue that the sutra is a Chinese apocryphal text that was composed in literary Chinese and reveals uniquely Chinese philosophical concerns. However, some scholars such as Ron Epstein argue that the text is a compilation of Indic materials with extensive editing in China. 

The sutra was translated into Tibetan during the late eighth to early ninth century and other complete translations exist in Tibetan, Mongolian and Manchu languages (see Translations).

Title
Śūraṅgama means "heroic valour", "heroic progress", or "heroic march". The Śūraṅgama Sūtra is not to be confused with the similarly titled Śūraṅgama Samadhi Sutra (T. 642 首楞嚴三昧經; Shǒuléngyán Sānmèi Jīng) which was translated by Kumārajīva (344-413).

An alternate translation of the title reads:

The title in different languages 
A common translation of the sutra's name in English is the "Heroic March sutra" (as used e.g. by Matthew Kapstein, Norman Waddell, and Andy Ferguson), or the "scripture of the Heroic Progress" (as used e.g. by Thomas Cleary).

The full title of the sutra also appears as: .

Authorship 
An original Sanskrit version of Śūraṅgama Sūtra is not known to be extant and the Indic provenance of the text is in question - it is likely to be apocryphal. A Sanskrit language palm leaf manuscript consisting of 226 leaves with 6 leaves missing which according to the introduction "contains the Śūraṅgama Sūtra" was discovered in a temple in China and now resides at Peng Xuefeng Memorial Museum. But scholars have not yet verified if this is the same text or some other sutra (like the Śūraṅgama Samadhi Sūtra).

The first catalogue that recorded the Śūraṅgama Sūtra was Zhisheng, a monk in Tang China. Zhisheng said this book was brought back from Guangxi to Luoyang during the reign of Emperor Xuanzong. He gave two different accounts in two different books, both of which were published in 730 CE.

Master Huai Di and an unnamed Indian monk.
The text was then polished and edited by Empress Wu Zetian's former minister, court regulator, and state censor Fang Yong of Qingho. The translation was reviewed by Śramaṇa Meghaśikha from Oḍḍiyāna, and certified by Śramaṇa Huai-di of Nanlou Monastery (南樓寺) on Mount Luofu (羅浮山).

Traditional views 
Traditionally there have been questions regarding the translation of this sutra as it was not sponsored by the Imperial Chinese Court and as such the records regarding its translation in the early eighth century were not carefully preserved. However, it has never been classified as apocrypha in any Chinese-language Tripitakas including the Taisho Tripitaka where it is placed in the Esoteric Sutra category (密教部). 

Dispute about this text arose in 8th century in Japan, so Emperor Kōnin sent Master Tokusei and a group of monks to China, asking whether this book was a forgery or not. A Chinese upasaka or layperson told the head monk of the Japanese monastic delegation, Master Tokusei that this was forged by Fang Yong. Zhu Xi, a 12th-century Neo-confucian who was opposed to Buddhism, believed that it was created during the Tang Dynasty in China, and did not come from India.

The Qianlong Emperor and the Third Changkya Khutukhtu, the traditional head tulku of the Gelug lineage of Tibetan Buddhism in Inner Mongolia, believed in the authenticity of the Śūraṅgama Sūtra. They later translated the Śūraṅgama Sūtra into the Manchu language, Mongolian and Tibetan. (see translations)

In favor of full Chinese composition 
Hurvitz claims that the Śūraṅgama Sūtra is "a Chinese forgery". Faure similarly claims that it is "apocryphal." 

In China during the early modern era, the reformist Liang Qichao claimed that the sutra is apocryphal, writing, "The real Buddhist scriptures would not say things like Surangama Sutra, so we know the Surangama Sutra is apocryphal. In the same era, Lü Cheng wrote an essay to claim that the book is apocryphal, named "One hundred reasons about why Shurangama Sutra is apocryphal". 

According to James Benn, the Japanese scholar Mochizuki Shinko's (1869-1948) Bukkyo kyoten seiritsu shiron "showed how many of the text's doctrinal elements may be traced to sources that already existed in China at the beginning of the eighth century, and he also described he early controversy surrounding the text in Japan." 

Charles Muller and Kogen Mizuno also hold that this sutra is apocryphal (and is similar to other apocryphal Chinese sutras). According to Muller, "even a brief glance" through these apocryphal works "by someone familiar with both indigenous sinitic philosophy and the Indian Mahāyāna textual corpus yields the recognition of themes, terms and concepts from indigenous traditions playing a dominant role in the text, to an extent which makes it obvious that they must have been written in East Asia." He also notes that apocryphal works like the Śūraṅgama contain terms that were only used in East Asia:...such as innate enlightenment (本覺 pen-chüeh) and actualized enlightenment (始覺 chih-chüeh) and other terms connected with the discourse of the tathāgatagarbha-ālayavijñāna problematik (the debate as to whether the human mind is, at its most fundamental level, pure or impure) appear in such number that the difference from the bona fide translations from Indic languages is obvious. Furthermore, the entire discourse of innate/actualized enlightenment and tathāgatagarbha-ālayavijñāna opposition can be seen as strongly reflecting a Chinese philosophical obsession dating back to at least the time of Mencius, when Mencius entered into debate with Kao-tzu on the original purity of the mind. The indigenous provenance of such texts is also indicated by their clear influence and borrowing from other current popular East Asian works, whether or not these other works were Indian or East Asian composition.  Muller also writes that the Śūraṅgama shows evidence of being influenced by the metaphysical framework of the Ch'i-hsin lun (Awakening of Faith), another apocryphal treatise composed in China.  

James A. Benn notes that the Śūraṅgama also "shares some notable similarities with another scripture composed in China and dating to the same period", that is, the Sutra of Perfect Enlightenment. Indeed, Benn states that "One might regard the Sutra of Perfect Enlightenment, which has only one fascicle, as opposed to the Śūraṅgama's ten, as a precis of the essential points of the Śūraṅgama." Benn points out several passages which present uniquely Chinese understandings of animal life and natural phenomena that are without Indic precedent (such as the "Jelly fish with shrimp for eyes" and the "wasps, which take the larvae of other insects as their own") but that are found in earlier Chinese literature. 

James A. Benn also notes how the Śūraṅgama even borrows ideas that are mostly found in Taoist sources (such as the Baopuzi), such as the idea that there are ten types of "immortals" (仙 xiān) in a realm located between the deva realm and the human realm. The qualities of these immortals include common ideas found in Taoism, such as their "ingestion of metals and minerals" and the practice of "movement and stillness"(dongzhi, which is related to daoyin). Benn argues that the Śūraṅgama's "taxonomy" of immortals was "clearly derived" from Taoist literature. In a similar fashion, the Śūraṅgama's "ten types of demons" (鬼 gui), are also influenced by Taoist and Confucian sources.

In favor of the sutra being based on Indian originals 
Ron Epstein gives an overview of the arguments for Indian or Chinese origin, and concludes: 

A number of scholars have associated the Śūraṅgama Sūtra with the Buddhist tradition at Nālandā. 

Epstein thinks that certain passages in the sutra do show Chinese influence, such as the section on the Taoist immortals, but he thinks that this "could easily represent an adaptive Chinese translation of Buddhist tantric ideas. The whole area of the doctrinal relationship between the Taoist nei-tan, or so-called "inner alchemy", and early Buddhist tantra is a murky one, and until we know more about both, the issue probably cannot be resolved adequately." Epstein further writes regarding uniquely Chinese influences found in the text: "As to things Chinese, there are various short references to them scattered throughout the text, but, just as well as indicating the work's Chinese origin, they also could be an indication of a translation style of substitution of parallel items, which would fit right in with the highly literary Chinese phraseology." 

In arguing for an Indic origin, Epstein gives three main reasons:

 He argues many Sanskrit terms which appear in the text, "including some not often found in other Chinese translations. Moreover, the transliteration system does not seem to follow that of other works." 
 Epstein also notes that the general doctrinal position of the sūtra (tantric tathagatagarbha teachings) does indeed correspond to what is known about the Buddhist teachings at Nālandā during this period. 
 Large sections "definitely seem to contain Indic materials. Some passages could conceivably have been constructed from texts already translated into Chinese, although given the bulk and complexity of the material, to account for much of the text in that way would mean that the task of authorship would have had to have been an enormous one. About other portions of the work, such as the bodhimanda and mantra, there can be no doubt about their direct Indic origin." 
Similarly, Rounds argues for an Indic source by pointing out "two indisputably Indian elements" in the sutra: the text's reliance on the Buddhist science of reasoning (hetuvidya) and the Śūraṅgama mantra.

Non-Chinese Translations 
The Śūraṅgama Sūtra was translated into Tibetan probably during the late eighth to early ninth century.  However possibly because of the persecution of Buddhism during King Langdarma’s reign (ca. 840-841), only a portion of Scroll 9 and Scroll 10 of the Śūraṅgama Sūtra are preserved in the surviving two ancient texts. Buton Rinchen Drub Rinpoche mentioned that one of the two texts was probably translated from Chinese; thereby suggesting the second text may have possibly been translated from another language.

The entire Śūraṅgama Sūtra was translated in 1763 from Chinese into the Manchu language, Mongolian and Tibetan languages and compiled into a four language set at the command of the Qianlong Emperor. The third Changkya Khutukhtu Rölpé Dorjé or 若必多吉 or Lalitavajra (1716–1786) convinced the Qianlong Emperor to engage in the translation. The third Changkya Khutukhtu supervised (and verified) with the help of Fu Nai the translation of the Śūraṅgama Sūtra. The complete translation of the Śūraṅgama Sūtra into Tibetan is found in a supplement to the Narthang Kangyur.

English translations 
There are a few English translations:
 The Surangama Sutra, published in A Buddhist Bible, translated by Dwight Goddard and Bhikshu Wai-tao.
 Charles Luk, 1967, Shurangama Sutra
 The Shurangama Sutra with commentary by Master Hsuan Hua. Volumes 1 to 8.  Buddhist Translation Society, 2nd edition (October 2003).
 Buddhist Text Translation Society (2009). The Śūraṅgama Sūtra, With Excerpts from the Commentary by the Venerable Master Hsüan Hua, A New Translation, p. 267. Dharma Realm Buddhist Association, 4951 Bodhi Way, Ukiah, California 95482 (707) 462-0939, bttsonline.org.

Teachings

Doctrinal orientation 
The Śūraṅgama Sūtra contains teachings from Yogācāra, Buddha-nature, and Vajrayana. It makes use of Buddhist logic with its methods of syllogism and the catuṣkoṭi "fourfold negation" first popularized by Nāgārjuna.

Main themes 
One of the main themes of the Śūraṅgama Sūtra is how knowledge of the Buddha's teaching (Dharma) is worthless unless it is coupled with the power of samādhi (meditative absorption), as well as the importance of moral precepts as a foundation for the Buddhist practice. Also stressed is the theme of how one effectively combats delusions and demonic influences that may arise during meditation. 

According to Ron Epstein, a key theme of the sutra is the "two types of mind", furthermore, "also contained in the work are a discussion of meditational methodology in terms of the importance of picking the proper faculty (indriya) as a vehicle for meditation, instructions for the construction of a tantric bodhimanda, a long mantra, a description of fifty-seven Bodhisattva stages, a description of the karmic relationship among the destinies (gati), or paths of rebirth, and an enumeration of fifty demonic states encountered on the path."  

Ron Epstein and David Rounds have suggested that the major themes of the Śūraṅgama Sūtra reflect the strains upon Indian Buddhism during the time of its creation. They cite the resurgence of non-Buddhist religions, and the crumbling social supports for monastic Buddhist institutions. This era also saw the emergence of Hindu tantrism and the beginnings of Esoteric Buddhism and the siddha traditions. They propose that moral challenges and general confusion about Buddhism are said to have then given rise to the themes of the Śūraṅgama Sūtra, such as clear understanding of principles, moral discipline, essential Buddhist cosmology, development of samādhi, and how to avoid falling into various delusions in meditation.

Two types of mind 
A key theme found in the Śūraṅgama Sūtra is the distinction between the true mind and the discriminating mind. The discriminating worldly mind is the ordinary quotidian mind that becomes entangled in rebirth, thinking, change and illusion. But, according to the Śūraṅgama, there is also "an everlasting true mind, which is our real nature, and which is the state of the Buddha." According to the Śūraṅgama, the worldly mind "is the mind that is the basis of death and rebirth and that has continued for the entirety of time...dependent upon perceived objects." 

This worldly mind is mistaken by sentient beings as being their true nature. Meanwhile, the "pure enlightened mind" is the underlying nature of all dharmas (phenomena). It is the ultimate reality which is also enlightenment, which has no beginning. It is the original and pure essence of nirvana. The true awakened mind is an unchanging awareness that remains still and independent of all sense objects, even while the discriminating mind changes. The pure mind then is the essential nature of awareness, not the ordinary awareness which is distorted and diseased. 

This theme of the everlasting true mind which is contrasted with the samsaric mind is also a common theme of the Mahayana Awakening of Faith treatise.

Buddha-nature 

The "everlasting true mind" is associated with the Mahayana teaching of tathāgatagarbha or buddha-nature. Rounds and Epstein explain the Śūraṅgama's conception of the tathāgatagarbha, the "Matrix of the Thus Come One", as follows:

Thus, according to the Śūraṅgama Sūtra the "buddha-womb" or "buddha-essence" is source of mind and world. This buddha nature is originally pure enlightenment, however, due to the deluded development of a subject-object separation, the whole world of birth and death arises.

Meditation practices 
The Śūraṅgama Sūtra teaches about the Śūraṅgama Samādhi (the "meditative absorption of the heroic march"), which is associated with complete enlightenment and Buddhahood. This samādhi is also featured extensively in the Śūraṅgama Samādhi Sūtra. It is equally praised in the Mahāparinirvāṇa Sūtra, where it is explained by the Buddha that this samādhi is the essence of the nature of the Buddha and is indeed the "mother of all Buddhas." The Buddha also comments that the Śūraṅgama Samādhi additionally goes under several other names, specifically Prajñāpāramitā ("Perfection of Wisdom"), the Vajra Samādhi, the Siṃhanāda Samādhi ("Lion's Roar Samādhi"), and the Buddha-svabhāva. 

The Śūraṅgama Sūtra contains various explanations of specific meditation practices which help one cultivate samadhi, including a famous passage in which twenty five sages discuss twenty five methods of practice. The main intent of these various methods is to detach one's awareness of all sense objects and to direct awareness inward, to the fundamental true nature. This leads to the experience of the disappearance of everything and finally to illumination. 

The most well known part of this passage is the meditation taught by bodhisattva Avalokiteshvara, the last of these sages to teach. Avalokiteshvara describes their method as follows:I began with a practice based on the enlightened nature of hearing. First I redirected my hearing inward in order to enter the current of the sages. Then external sounds disappeared. With the direction of my hearing reversed and with sounds stilled, both sounds and silence ceased to arise. So it was that, as I gradually progressed, what I heard and my awareness of what I heard came to an end. Even when that state of mind in which everything had come to an end disappeared, I did not rest. My awareness and the objects of my awareness were emptied, and when that process of emptying my awareness was wholly complete, then even that emptying and what had been emptied vanished. Coming into being and ceasing to be themselves ceased to be. Then the ultimate stillness was revealed. All of a sudden I transcended the worlds of ordinary beings, and I also transcended the worlds of beings who have transcended the ordinary worlds. Everything in the ten directions was fully illuminated, and I gained two remarkable powers. First, my mind ascended to unite with the fundamental, wondrous, enlightened mind of all Buddhas in all ten directions, and my power of compassion became the same as theirs. Second, my mind descended to unite with all beings of the six destinies in all ten directions such that I felt their sorrows and their prayerful yearnings as my own. World-Honored One, because I had made offerings to the Thus-Come One Who Hears the Cries of the World, I received from that Thus-Come One a hidden transmission of a vajra-like samādhi such that my power of compassion became the same as the Buddhas’. I was then able to go to all lands and appear in thirty-two forms that respond to what beings require

Ethics and traditional practices 
The Śūraṅgama Sūtra also focuses on the necessity of keeping traditional ethical precepts, especially the five precepts and the monastic vinaya. These precepts are said to be the basis to samadhi which in turn leads to wisdom. The Buddha describes the precepts as clear and unalterable instruction on purity which transverse time and place. If one breaks them (by killing, stealing, lying etc.) one will never reach enlightenment, no matter how much one meditates. 

Indeed, according to the Śūraṅgama:No matter how much you may practice samādhi in order to transcend the stress of entanglement with perceived objects, you will never transcend that stress until you have freed yourself from thoughts of killing. Even very intelligent people who can enter samādhi while practicing meditation in stillness are certain to fall into the realm of ghosts and spirits upon their rebirth if they have not renounced all killing.Similarly, the sutra also claims that unless one frees oneself from sensual desire, sexual activity, meat eating (which it associated with killing), stealing or lying, one will not reach enlightenment. According to the Śūraṅgama, even though one may have some wisdom and meditative absorption, one is certain to enter bad rebirths, even the hells, if one does not cease lust, killing, stealing and making false claims. 

The Śūraṅgama also warns against heterodox teachers who practice meditation without being properly prepared and then fall under the influence of demons. These teachers then begin to spout heterodoxies, such as the idea that practitioners should stop revering stupas and temples, wishing to destroy sutras and Buddha statues and engaging in sex while saying that "the male and female organs are the true abodes of bodhi and nirvana". James A. Benn notes that the first teaching may be a reference to certain radical Chan masters of the time, while the second one may refer to certain esoteric Buddhist practices which made use of ritual sex.

Diet, lifestyle and ascetic practice 
The Śūraṅgama Sūtra argues for strict dietary rules, including vegetarianism and the avoidance of the five pungent roots (radish, leek, onion, garlic, asafoetida). The sutra argues that these dietary choices "drive away bodhisattvas, gods, and xian [immortals], who protect the practitioner in this life, and attracts instead hungry ghosts." The sutra also states that eating meat can have dire consequences:You should know that those who eat meat, although their minds maybe opened and realize a semblance of samadhi, will become great raksasas (demons). When that retribution is over, they will sink back into the bitter ocean of samsara and will not be able to be disciples of the Buddha.  The Śūraṅgama goes even further with its ascetic injunctions, recommending the avoidance of animal products such as silk, leather, furs, milk, cream, and butter and arguing that this abstention can be a cause of enlightenment: Bodhisattvas and pure monks walking on country paths will not even tread on living grasses, much less uproot them. How then can it be compassionate to gorge on other beings’ blood and flesh? Monks who will not wear silks from the East, whether coarse or fine; who will not wear shoes or boots of leather, nor furs, nor birds’ down from our own country; and who will not consume milk, curds, or ghee, have truly freed themselves from the world. When they have paid their debts from previous lives, they will roam no longer through the three realms. “Why? To wear parts of a being’s body is to involve one’s karma with that being, just as people have become bound to this earth by eating vegetables and grains. I can affirm that a person who neither eats the flesh of other beings nor wears any part of the bodies of other beings, nor even thinks of eating or wearing these things, is a person who will gain liberation.The sutra also teaches the practice of the burning of the body as an offering to the Buddhas.

The White Parasol Crown Dhāraṇī 

In addition to the sūtra's doctrinal content, it also contains a long dhāraṇī (chant, incantation) which is known in Chinese as the Léngyán Zhòu (楞嚴咒), or Śūraṅgama Mantra. It is well-known and popularly chanted in East Asian Buddhism. In Sanskrit, the dhāraṇī is known as the Sitātapatra Uṣṇīṣa Dhāraṇī (Ch. 大白傘蓋陀羅尼). This is sometimes simplified in English to White Canopy Dhāraṇī or White Parasol Dhāraṇī. In Tibetan traditions, the English is instead sometimes rendered as the "White Umbrella Mantra." The dhāraṇī is extant in three other translations found in the Chinese Buddhist canon, and is also preserved in Sanskrit and Tibetan. 

This dhāraṇī is often seen as having magical apotropaic powers, as it is associated with the deity Sitātapatra, a protector against supernatural dangers and evil beings. The Śūraṅgama Sūtra also states that the dhāraṇī can be used as an expedient means to enter into the Śūraṅgama samadhi. According to Rounds, the sutra also "gives precise instructions on the construction and consecration of a sacred space in which a practicioner can properly focus on recitation of the mantra."  

The Śūraṅgama Mantra is widely recited in China, Korea and Vietnam by Mahayana monastics on a daily basis and by some laypersons as part of the Morning Recitation Liturgy. The mantra is also recited by some Japanese Buddhist sects.

Realms of rebirth, bodhisattva stages and Demons 

The Śūraṅgama Sūtra also contains various explanations of Buddhist cosmology and soteriology. The sutra outlines various levels of enlightenment, the fifty five bodhisattva stages. It also contains explanations of the horrible sufferings that are experienced in the hells (narakas) as well as explanations of the other realms of rebirth. 

Another theme found in the Śūraṅgama Sūtra is that of various Māras (demonic beings) which are manifestations of the five skandhas (aggregates). In its section on the fifty skandha-māras, each of the five skandhas has ten skandha-māras associated with it, and each skandha-māra is described in detail as a deviation from correct samādhi. These skandha-māras are also known as the "fifty skandha demons" in some English-language publications. Epstein introduces the fifty skandha-māras section as follows:

Influence 

James A. Benn, while arguing that the text is a Chinese composition, also writes that, "no crude fake, the Śūraṅgama is elegantly constructed and beautifully written, a text that we might easily rank among the masterpieces of medieval Chinese literature. It today remains a widely read text, much appreciated,and seriously studied by Chinese Buddhists. Its insights continue to inform the lives and practices of both monastics and laypeople. That it is not a translation of an Indian original by no means discredits its spiritual value. Buddhism from its origins was adaptable to local circumstances, and the Śūraṅgama is but another example of that missionary spirit."

Mainland East Asia
The Śūraṅgama Sūtra has been widely studied and commented on in China. Ron Epstein has "found reference to 127 Chinese commentaries on the Sutra, quite a few for such a lengthy work, including 59 in the Ming dynasty alone, when it was especially popular".

The Śūraṅgama Sūtra is one of the seminal texts of Chán Buddhism. It is held to have been first transmitted by Yuquan Shenxiu, the original sixth patriarch and the seminal figure of the Northern school. The Śūraṅgama was particularly influential during the Song Dynasty, where it was used in a ritual called the Śūraṅgama assembly which "was held semi-annually during monastic retreats, and there the participants chanted the long magical spell (dharani) contained in the sutra. The dharani was also recited at memorial services for Chan abbots and patriarchs." The sūtra is cited in various Chan Buddhist texts, like the Blue Cliff Record (case 94). The Śūraṅgama Sūtra also influenced the work of several Song intellectuals, like Su Shi (1037-1101) and Su Zhe (1039-1112). 

The Śūraṅgama Sūtra was also a required text for Korea's monastic examination system during the Joseon period. The Śūraṅgama remains one of the most influential sources in the advanced curriculum of Korean Sŏn monasteries, along with the Awakening of Faith and the Vajrasamadhi sutra.  

The Śūraṅgama was also said to have been "connected with the enlightenment" of Changshui Zixuan from the Song dynasty and Hanshan Deqing (憨山德清) from the Ming.

The contemporary Chán-master Venerable Hsu Yun wrote a commentary on the Śūraṅgama Sūtra. Venerable Hsuan Hua was a major modern proponent of and commentator on the Śūraṅgama Sūtra. According to Hsuan Hua:

Japan
The Japanese Zen Buddhist Dōgen held that the sutra was not an authentic Indian text. But he also drew on the text, commenting on the Śūraṅgama verse "when someone gives rise to Truth by returning to the Source, the whole of space in all ten quarters falls away and vanishes" as follows:

Notes
Note: Several notes are Chinese, due to the international character of Wikipedia. Help in translation is welcome.

Chinese texts

References

Sources

  The Śūraṅgama Sūtra Translation Committee of the Buddhist Text Translation Society. (2009). The Śūraṅgama Sūtra: With Excerpts from the Commentary by the Venerable Master Hsüan Hua: A New Translation. Ukiah, CA, USA:  Buddhist Text Translation Society..
 
 
 
 
 
 
 
  Charles Luk, Buddha Dharma Education Association Inc.

External links

 The Śūraṅgama Sūtra: With Excerpts from the Commentary by the Venerable Master Hsüan Hua: A New Translation (2012). Ukiah, CA, USA:  Buddhist Text Translation Society. 
 The  in Indonesian translated by Karma Samten
 The  in English with commentaries from Master Han Shan translated by Charles Luk
 The  text with commentaries from Tripitaka Master Hsuan Hua
 : Text, Commentaries, and Articles 
 Sanskrit and Chinese versions of the Shurangama mantra 

Mahayana sutras
Zen texts